Christ Church Detroit is an Episcopal church located at 960 East Jefferson Avenue in Detroit, Michigan. It is also known as  Old Christ Church, Detroit. It is the oldest Protestant church in Michigan still located on its original site. It was designated a Michigan State Historic Site in 1970 and listed on the National Register of Historic Places in 1971.

History 
Brothers Robert (Jr.) and William Stead ran a wholesale grocery business at the present site of Christ Church until the year 1844. Christ Church Detroit was founded by a group of Episcopalians in 1845, who decided that St. Paul's Church (now St. Paul's Cathedral) was too crowded. The founders built a small wooden church, designed by Lieutenant Montgomery C. Meigs, as its first place of worship. Fifteen years later, plans were laid for a new building on the same site. In 1861, a chapel was constructed near the original structure for use while a larger church was constructed. The present church, designed by Gordon W. Lloyd, was completed in 1864.

Construction 
The church is built in an American Gothic style, using limestone and sandstone; a massive belfry with a squared-off Germanic roof dominates the front facade. The interior boasts transepts with galleries and hammerbeam trusses supporting the roof. All interior woodwork, save the roof, is made from local butternut. There are two Tiffany windows in the church, with more windows designed by other famous glass companies such as Franz Meyer and Company and J. Wippell and Co.

Current use 
The Christ Church building has been continuously by an Episcopalian congregation since its construction. The current Rector is the Rev. Emily Williams Guffey. The congregation describes themselves as "a contemporary, well-educated, multi-racial, multi-ethnic congregation carrying out Christ's mission in the world around us, strengthened, nurtured, and guided by the presence of the Holy Spirit." The next-door Sibley House serves as offices.

Gallery

References

External links 

 Christ Church Detroit website

Churches in Detroit
Episcopal church buildings in Michigan
Churches completed in 1863
19th-century Episcopal church buildings
Michigan State Historic Sites in Wayne County, Michigan
Churches on the National Register of Historic Places in Michigan
National Register of Historic Places in Detroit
Gothic Revival church buildings in Michigan